Pleasant Grove, also known as Laura Ann Farm and Oakworld, is a historic home located near Palmyra, Fluvanna County, Virginia.  It was built in 1854, and is a two-story, five bay, brick dwelling with a low hipped roof.  The house has a -story, shed roofed, frame lean-to addition. It features a four bay pedimented front porch, a mousetooth cornice, architrave moldings, and a delicate stair with paneled spandrel. Also on the property are the contributing outdoor kitchen, smokehouse, and Haden family cemetery. Fluvanna County acquired the property in December 1994.

It was listed on the National Register of Historic Places in 2004.

References

External links
 Pleasant Grove - County of Fluvanna

Houses on the National Register of Historic Places in Virginia
Houses completed in 1854
Houses in Fluvanna County, Virginia
National Register of Historic Places in Fluvanna County, Virginia
Museums in Fluvanna County, Virginia
Historic house museums in Virginia